These are the Australian Country number-one albums of 2006, per the ARIA Charts.

See also
2006 in music
List of number-one albums of 2006 (Australia)

References

2006
Australia Country Albums
Number one Country Albums